Josh or Joshua Allen may refer to:

 Josh Allen (offensive lineman) (born 1991), former American football player
 Josh Allen (quarterback) (born 1996), American football quarterback in the NFL for the Buffalo Bills since 2018
 Josh Allen (outside linebacker) (born 1997), American football defensive end in the NFL for the Jacksonville Jaguars
 Joshua Allen (born 1989), dancer and winner of the fourth season of So You Think You Can Dance
 William J. Allen (1829–1901), known as Josh Allen, United States Representative from Illinois during the Civil War and United States District Judge
 Joshua Allen, 2nd Viscount Allen
 Joshua Allen, 5th Viscount Allen
 Joshua Allen, 6th Viscount Allen